Paltothemis lineatipes, or red rock skimmer, is a species of skimmers in the family Libellulidae. It is found in the Americas.

Paltothemis lineatipes is considered to be least concern by the International Union for Conservation of Nature. The population is stable.

References

 Garrison, Rosser W. / Poole, Robert W., and Patricia Gentili, eds. (1997). "Odonata". Nomina Insecta Nearctica: A Check List of the Insects of North America, vol. 4: Non-Holometabolous Orders, 551-580.
 Paulson, Dennis R., and Sidney W. Dunkle (1999). "A Checklist of North American Odonata including English name, etymology, type locality, and distribution". Slater Museum of Natural History, University of Puget Sound, Occasional Paper no. 56, 88.
 Steinmann, Henrik / Wermuth, Heinz, and Maximilian Fischer, eds. (1997). "World Catalogue of Odonata, Volume II: Anisoptera". Das Tierreich, vol. 111, part, xiv + 636.

Further reading

 Arnett, Ross H. (2000). American Insects: A Handbook of the Insects of America North of Mexico. CRC Press.

External links

 NCBI Taxonomy Browser, Paltothemis lineatipes

Libellulidae
Insects described in 1890